The 1993 Tippeligaen was the 49th completed season of top division football in Norway. Each team played 22 games with 3 points given for wins and 1 for draws. Number eleven and twelve are relegated. The winners of the two groups of the first division were promoted, as well as the winner of a series of play-off matches between the two second placed teams in the two groups of the first division and number ten in the Tippeligaen.

Teams and locations
''Note: Table lists in alphabetical order.

League table

Relegation play-offs
The qualification play-off matches were contested between Molde (10th in Tippeligaen), Strømsgodset (2nd in the First Division - Group A), and Bryne (2nd in the First Division - Group B). Strømsgodset won both their games and were promoted to Tippeligaen.

Results
Match 1: Molde 0–2 Strømsgodset
Match 2: Bryne 2–2 Molde
Match 3: Strømsgodset 2–0 Bryne

Results

Season statistics

Top scorers

Attendances

References 

Eliteserien seasons
Norway
Norway
1